South Dix is a mountain located in Essex County, New York. 
The mountain is part of the Dix Range, named after John A. Dix (1798–1879), New York Secretary of State in 1837, and later Governor.
The name is being changed to Carson Peak, after Russell M.L. Carson (1884–1961), author of Peaks and People of the Adirondacks.
South Dix is flanked to the northeast by Grace Peak (formerly known as East Dix), to the northwest by Hough Peak, and to the southwest by Macomb Mountain.

The north side of South Dix drains into the headwaters of the South Fork of the Boquet River, thence into Lake Champlain, which drains into Canada's Richelieu River, the Saint Lawrence River, and into the Gulf of Saint Lawrence.
The southeast side of South Dix drains into West Mill Brook, thence into the Schroon River, the Hudson River, and into New York Bay.
The west side of South Dix drains into Lillian Brook, thence into the East Inlet of Elk Lake, and into The Branch of the Schroon River.

South Dix is within the Dix Mountain Wilderness Area of Adirondack State Park.

See also 
 List of mountains in New York
 Northeast 111 4,000-footers 
 Adirondack High Peaks
 Adirondack Forty-Sixers

References

External links 
 

Mountains of Essex County, New York
Adirondack High Peaks
Mountains of New York (state)